Cholet Basket is a professional basketball club that is based in Cholet, France. The club plays in the LNB Pro A. Their home arena is La Meilleraie. Established in 1975, Cholet won its first French championship in the 2009–10 season. In 1998 and 1999, Cholet won the French Cup.

History

Establishment
The team debuted in the 1st division in the 1987–88 season and after managing to get to the premier league in only 12 years. The team were able to sustain themselves in the league, and were consistently in the top 10 teams having a highly successful youth system. This youth system has allowed the club to produce professional players season after season. After winning the National Cup in 1999, Cholet got automatically qualified for its first participation to the Euroleague (3 victories – 13 defeats). During the 2004–05 season 10 of the 12 players in the first team derived from the youth system. Some of the most illustrious players who had their debut in the team are Antoine Rigaudeau, Jim Bilba and Mickaël Gelabale.

During the 2008–2009 season, Cholet was defeated by Virtus Bologna in the EuroChallenge's Final (75–77).

In 2010, Cholet finished 1st of the 2009–2010 Pro A League regular season and won the championship after defeating Le Mans in the Play-Offs Final (81–65). Thanks to its national champion title, Cholet is automatically qualified for the 2010–2011 Euroleague season. Cholet was eliminated during the first round (4 victories – 6 defeats) of the 2010–2011 Euroleague after defeating prestigious (and at the time unbeaten) Fenerbahçe Ülker (82–78).

In 2011, Cholet, defending its title finished 1st again of the 2011-12 Pro A League regular season and was only defeated during the finals by SLUC Nancy (74-76).

Logos

Youth academy
Cholet Basket is intensively focusing on its Youth Academy to provide players to its professional squad. During the 2004–05 season, 10 of the 12 players of the Pro squad have progressed through the club Youth Academy. It is also one of the only six European clubs to have provided two players to the same NBA draft in 2009, with Rodrigues Beaubois and Nando De Colo beside Real Madrid (2005), Joventut Badalona (2009), Fenerbahçe Ülker (2008), KK Partizan (2002) and Pau-Ortez (2003).

Notable Players that have progressed through the Cholet Youth Academy (Espoirs)

Players

Retired numbers

Current roster

FIBA Hall of Famers

Season by season

Achievements
 French Championship Pro A: 2010
 La Semaine des As Cup: 2008
 French Cup: 1998, 1999
 Match des Champions (French Pro A Champion vs French Cup winner): 2010
 Finalist of Pro A: 1988, 2011
 French Cup Finalist: 2005, 2008
 Finalist of the Tournoi des As Cup: 1988, 1989, 1990 and 1993.
 Champion of Division 2 (now Pro B): 1986

Notable players

Head coaches
 1970s:  Dragoş Nosievici
 1987–89:  Jean Galle
 1989–91:  Jean-Paul Rebatet
 1991–95:  Laurent Buffard
 1995–96:  Alain Thinet (7 games) then  Eric Girard (1 game) then  Jean Galle
 1996–2001:  Eric Girard
 2001–02:   Savo Vucević
 2002–03:  Jean-François Martin
 2003–04:  Erman Kunter
 2004–06:  Ruddy Nelhomme
 2006–10:  Erman Kunter
 2010–12:   Erman Kunter
 2012–14:  Jean-Manuel Sousa
 2014–15:  Laurent Buffard
 2015–16:  Jérôme Navier
 2016–18:  Philippe Hervé
 2018:  Régis Boissié
 2018–21:   Erman Kunter
 2021–present:  Laurent Vila

References

External links
 Official website
 LNB Club Profile 
 Euroleague Club Profile 

Cholet Basket
Basketball teams in France
Sport in Maine-et-Loire